Nahant Bay is an Atlantic Ocean bay, fronted by Swampscott,  Lynn, and Nahant, Massachusetts. Egg Rock is located in the Nahant Bay.

References

Bays of Massachusetts
Bays of Essex County, Massachusetts
Nahant, Massachusetts